The Communist Party of Belgium (or KPB; , PCB) was a political party in Belgium from 1921 to 1989. The youth wing of KPB/PCB was known as the Communist Youth of Belgium. The party published a newspaper known as Le Drapeau Rouge in French and De Roode Vaan in Dutch.

History 
The Communist Party of Belgium was formed at a congress in Anderlecht, Brussels on 3–4 September 1921. KPB/PCB was formed through the unification of two groups, the Communist Party led by War Van Overstraeten and the Belgian Communist Party led by Joseph Jacquemotte, following a split from the Belgian Workers Party. At the time of its foundation, KPB/PCB had around 500 members. KPB/PCB became the Belgian section of the Communist International. The party gained parliamentary presence in 1925, as both Van Overstraeten and Jacquemotte were elected to the Chamber of Representatives. By 1935 KPB/PCB had 9 deputies in the Chamber and 4 members in the Senate. In 1938 it had a membership of about 8,500.

During the Second World War, the party had to go underground during German occupation. The party was also closely affiliated with the Partisans Armés, a resistance group during the occupation, however in 1943 much of the party leadership was arrested by German forces. After the end of the war, the party was strengthened and obtained 25% in the parliamentary elections. The party participated in a coalition government with the socialists and the liberals from 1946 to 1947.

On 18 August 1950 the party chairman, Julien Lahaut, was assassinated.

In the mid 1960s the U.S. State Department estimated the party membership to be approximately 9,890.

KPB/PCB lost its parliamentary presence in 1985.

In 1989 KPB/PCB was divided into two separate parties, Kommunistische Partij in Flanders and Parti Communiste in Wallonia.

Several foreign communist parties, American, British, German, French and Dutch, had branches in Belgium.

Chairmen of KPB/PCB 
 Julien Lahaut 1945–1950 
 Ernest Burnelle 1954–1968
 Marc Drumaux 1968–1972
 Louis Van Geyt 1972–1989

General Secretaries of KPB/PCB 
 Edgard Lalmand 1943–1954

Notable members 
 Bert Van Hoorick
 Edward Gierek 
 René Magritte
 Charles Plisnier

Communist burgomasters (mayors) 
 Marcel Levaux (1926–2006), last mayor of Cheratte (Liège province) from April 1971 to December 1976 (in 1977 this commune was absorbed into Visé), deputy from 1968 to 1981
 René Noël, last mayor of Cuesmes (Hainaut province) from 1965 to 1971 (in 1972 this commune was absorbed into Mons), senator from 1949 to 1950, then again from 1954 to 1974
 Marcel Mereau, mayor of Hensies (Hainaut province)
 Elie Hoyas, mayor of Le Roeulx (Hainaut province) from 1976 to 1982
 Marcel Couteau, mayor of Le Roeulx (Hainaut province) from 1982 to 1985, deputy from 1968 to 1974
 Henri Glineur, mayor of Roux (now a part of Charleroi, Hainaut province) from 1947 to 1950, senator from 1946 to 1954
 René Mathy, last mayor of Vyle-et-Tharoul (in 1977 this commune was absorbed into Marchin, Liège province)
 Paul Carette, mayor of Warchin (in 1977 this commune was absorbed into Tournai, Hainaut province)

Election results 

 In the 1971 and 1977 General Elections, the Communist Party used separate lists for both Flanders and Wallonia, despite remaining a single party
 It is unclear whether the Communist Party decided not to run separate lists for the 1974 General Election or the data for regional lists is simply not available

See also 
 Communist Struggle (Marxist–Leninist)

Sources 
 Geschiedenis van de Belgische KP 
 1928: Splitsing tussen trotskisten en stalinisten in Belgische KP

References 

Belgium
Defunct communist parties in Belgium
Political parties established in 1921
Political parties disestablished in 1989
1921 establishments in Belgium
1989 disestablishments in Belgium